Robert Doyne may refer to:

 Sir Robert Doyne (1651–1733), Irish politician and judge
 Robert Walter Doyne (1857–1916), British ophthalmologist